Mauer is the German word for wall. It may also refer to:

Places
Mauer, Vienna, a former village of Lower Austria that has been part of Vienna since 1938
Mauer bei Amstetten, a village in the municipality of Amstetten, in Lower Austria
Mauer bei Melk, a village in the municipality of Dunkelsteinerwald, in the Mostviertel in Lower Austria
Mauer (Baden), a village of the Rhein-Neckar-Kreis in Germany

People
Albert Mauer (1907–1999), former Polish ice hockey player
Frank Mauer (born 1988), German ice hockey player
Gary Mauer, actor
Jake Mauer (born 1978), former baseball player and baseball manager; also older brother of Joe Mauer
John Mauer (1901–1978), former college basketball coach for the University of Kentucky and later for the University of Tennessee
Joe Mauer (born 1983), all-star catcher for the Minnesota Twins (Major League Baseball)
Ken Mauer (born 1955), NBA referee
Renata Mauer (born 1969), Polish sports shooter
Rocco Mauer (born 1988), US rugby player

Music
Die Chinesische Mauer ("The Chinese Wall"), a 1985 album by Michael Cretu

Other 
Berlin Wall (Berliner Mauer), a barrier that divided Berlin from 1961 to 1989
Mauer 1, a fossilized mandible, type specimen of the Homo heidelbergensis, named after its place of discovery Mauer
Also used to refer to the Inner German border, mid-1950s–1989

See also
Maurer, is the German word for bricklayer and a more common surname
Maur (disambiguation), place and surname
Auf der Maur, surname
In der Maur, surname